Kornit Digital is an Israeli-American international manufacturing company. It produces high-speed industrial inkjet printers, and pigmented ink and chemical products for the garment and apparel, home goods, and textile accessories decorating industry. Kornit Digital has offices in Israel, Hong Kong, China, Germany and the USA. Ofer Ben Zur was Kornit CEO from its founding in 2002 until 2014, when he was succeeded by Gabi Seligsohn; Ben Zur remained as Chief Technology Officer. Ronen Samuel, formerly of HP Indigo, succeeded Seligsohn as CEO in June of 2018.

History
The company was founded in 2002 by a team that previously worked in the digital printing field, at companies such as Scitex and Hewlett-Packard. The company uses the same technology used in digital printing and has applied it to digital textile printing, which has developed more slowly than the field of digital printing.

In 2015 Kornit Digital went public.

In October 2018 Kornit moved its North American operations to a showroom in Englewood, New Jersey.

In August 2020, Kornit Digital announced the acquisition of UK-based global software firm Custom Gateway.

In August 2021, Kornit Digital announced the acquisition of a Massachusetts based multi-material footwear manufacturer Voxel8.

In 2022, Kornit Digital announced the acquisition of Lichtenau, Germany-based Tesoma manufacturer of textile curing solutions.

Products and technologies 
Kornit Digital sells direct-to-garment printers of different varieties. Its printers include RIP software customized to each machine.

Kornit's machines use a pre-treatment wetting process that is integrated into the printer, which it calls The PreT System. This enables printing on the garment without manual pre-treatment, by applying a fixation agent automatically on press, immediately prior to the print process. This process makes wet-on-wet printing possible.

The company also provides a process that enables printing on dark garments. This process includes coating finished garments with a white coat of ink created from patented inks formed from CMYK. Kornit's ink plant in Kiryat Gat produces CMYK and white ink for its customers. Kornit systems with a "Hexa" or "HD6" designation supplement CMYK with primary red and green inks for increased color gamut.

Kornit markets its systems as a sustainable alternative to screen printing, dye sublimation, reactive dyes, and other textile print methods; the company's inks have received Oeko-Tex approval in the industry.

Key systems debuted:

 Kornit Paradigm
 Kornit Breeze
 Kornit Thunder
 2004: Kornit Storm
 2005: Kornit Avalanche
 2012: Konit Allegro
 2014: Kornit Avalanche 1000
 2014: Kornit Avalanche Hexa
 2017: Kornit Avalanche R-Series (introduced recirculating print heads)
 2017: Kornit Vulcan
 2018: Kornit Avalanche HD6/HDK
 2018: Kornit Storm HD6
 2019: Kornit Atlas
 2019: Kornit Presto
 Kornit Atlas Max
 Kornit Presto Max

In 2019 Kornit released Avalanche Poly Pro, the first digital direct-to-garment print system developed specifically for polyester and poly-blend fabrics, as well as the Presto, a successor to Allegro for the roll-to-roll direct-to-fabric print market. Avalanche Poly Pro was later named "Best Direct-to-Garment Print System" by the European Digital Press Association.

Headquarters and branches 
Kornit Digital's global headquarters are located in Rosh HaAyin, Israel.

Kornit Digital's Asia-Pacific operations (KDAP) are based in Kowloon City, Hong Kong and Shanghai, China. Ilan Elad is KDAP President.

Kornit Digital's Europe operations (KDEU) are based in Düsseldorf, Germany. Chris Govier is KDEU Managing Director.

Kornit Digital's Americas operations (KDAM) are based in Englewood, New Jersey, USA. Chuck Meyo is KDAM President.

References

External links
 Official website

Manufacturing companies of Israel
Companies listed on the Nasdaq